The 2020 Punjab alcohol poisoning was an incident in late July and early August 2020, where at least 100 people died after drinking illegally-made toxic alcohol in Punjab, India. Hundreds of raids were conducted in the three affected districts - Amritsar, Gurdaspur and Tarn Taran - along with several other places in and around the Rajpura and Shambhu border in Punjab. Forty people were arrested in relation to the incident.
Seven excise officials, six policemen were also suspended over the incident.

Background

Prevalence of alcohol in Punjab 
Drinking in India has always existed since the Vedic age. According to a World Health Organisation (WHO) report, which revealed that more than 11% of Indians were binge drinkers. In Punjab, the number of people drinking far exceeds the average in India. It is surprising that more than half of Punjabi men drink alcohol and the state also houses the highest proportion of children consuming alcohol. The reasons why this phenomenon is so prevalent are that Punjabi's hold much pride and honour in their family name, they don't want to be seen as having a problem or as being weak, and alcohol is the one thing that helps them deal with everyday life.

Reasons for the making and drinking of toxic alcohol 
The WHO reckons that "unrecorded" alcohol makes up more than half of all alcohol consumed in India. Locally brewed liquor, for example, is not recorded or taxed in some states. A survey by the International Alliance of Responsible Drinking in 2014 found a large number of drinkers preferring country liquor or homemade alcohol, often counterfeit and contraband.

One reason why illegal liquor is so popular is the huge unfulfilled demand for alcohol, which drives supply underground into an unregulated industry. India is the second biggest consumer of alcohol in the world, nearly one in every two bottles of whiskey brought around the world is sold there. Because of the difference in the prices of IMFL liquor and illegal liquor, to limit consumption, many state governments impose excessive taxes on alcohol sales. The state controls the alcohol industry in India, where the poor cannot afford licensed trademarks in government stores, but illegal liquor made in backstreet distilleries that sells for just 10 cents a litre, affordable even for the poorest.

Investigation 
The initial investigation revealed that the liquor contained methanol. A Ludhiana-based paint store owner, allegedly responsible for the toxic liquor deaths revealed that he supplied the three drums of methanol, which were used to make the illegal methanol-based alcohol.

Response by the government

To criminals 
According to The Indian Express, properties of those culprits will be confiscated and the Amarinder Singh government was mulling the death penalty for manufacturers and suppliers of spurious liquor.

Rajeev Joshi 
Rajeev Joshi was responsible for the case of alcohol poisoning in Punjab. He was procuring various types of alcohol and spirits from Punjab and Delhi and this time supplied the three drums of methanol, which were used to make the spurious methanol-based alcohol. He was arrested late on 3 August.

Ravinder Singh Anand 
Ravinder Singh Anand of Moga had bought three cans of spurious liquor from the Ludhiana businessman. He was arrested before 3 August.

Jaswant Singh and Balwinder Kaur  
Jaswant and Balwinder have been notorious for the production and sale of spurious liquor. Jaswant Singh died after consuming his own distillate. Balwinder Kaur was arrested before 4 August.

Harjit Singh and Shamsher Singh 
Harjit Singh and Shamsher Singh are two key absconders of father-son duo from Pandori Golain in the hooch tragedy. They were arrested on 7 August.

Other criminals 
The number of arrests in the case had gone up to 40 as of 4 August, and it had increased to 54 by 26 August.

To officials 
The state government suspended seven excise officials and sic police officials before 1 August.

To victims 
On 1 August, the government announced a compensation of ₹200,000 (₹2 lakh) for each of the families of the deceased.

On 7 August, Chief Minister Amarinder Singh announced an increase in the compensation from ₹2 lakh to ₹5 lakh to the kin of the deceased. He also announced a relief of ₹5 lakh to those who survived the tragedy but lost their eyesight.

Besides, Amarinder Singh handed over a cheque of ₹29,200,000 (₹2.92 crore) for 92 victim families of Tarn Taran to the deputy commissioner.

Poisioning
In late July and early August 2020, 80 deaths were reported in Tarn Taran district alone, followed by 12 from Amritsar and 11 from Gurdaspur's Batala in Punjab, India due to toxic alcohol poisoning. The first deaths were reported in Amritsar district's Muchhal village on the night of 29 July 2020. By 31 July 2020, the Punjab state had reported 39 deaths. By 3 August, the death toll from poisoning linked to toxic liquor rose to 105.

The number of dead reached 121 on 7 August, which included 92 from Tarn Taran district, 15 from in Amritsar district and 14 from Gurdaspur district.

Impact on health

Methanol poisoning 
Acute alcohol poisoning has high morbidity and mortality and needs to be considered seriously and instantly managed. Delay in treatment may cause complications, permanent damage, or death.

Methanol is a sedative for central nervous system (CNS) which is potentially toxic. Once people ingest excessive methanol, it will lead to methanol poisoning and severe consequences for health. Because it produces poisonous metabolites, it has many adverse effects on vision, and central nervous system, and the liver. Toxic metabolites accumulate more and have a more significant impact on health and sometimes poison to death. According to the autopsy, methanol is stored in body fluids such as cerebrospinal fluid and bile. These fluids are in organs of the brain, spleen, and lungs. Therefore, these organs are vulnerable to excessive ingestion of methanol.

Short-term health effects of methanol poisoning 
The short-term manifestations of methanol poisoning begin within 0.5 to 4 hours after ingestion, increased heart rate, and the possibility of heart failure, including typical symptoms of gastrointestinal diseases such as vomiting, diarrhea, nausea or abdominal pain, and CNS inhibition (confusion and sleepiness). The following are the physical symptoms of mild central nervous system poisoning. Patients manifest different symptoms such as headache, dizziness, blurred consciousness, balance disorder, convulsions, stiffness, coma-induced apathy, and worsening pronunciation and memory impairment. Severe poisoning manifests mainly in CNS. In the brain, methanol can cause diffuse edema, necrosis white and grey matter, atrophy, cerebral and intraventricular haemorrhage, optic haemorrhages, nerve lesions, and convulsions that may occur after edema of the brain. In severe cases, seizures of the brain can cause a coma.

Depending on the absorbed dose, decompensated metabolic acidosis occurs after a latent period of 6 to 24 hours. It can also result in Visual disturbances such as blurred vision, enlarged pupils. With photophobia, diplopia, early or late blindness, and less commonly, nystagmus.

Complications 

Complications of methanol poisoning include:
 Metabolic acidosis
 Permanent visual deficits 
 Parkinson-like disease
 Coma
 Respiratory failure
 Circulatory failure 
 Complications associated with dialysis 
 Death

Long-term health effects of methanol poisoning 
Methanol poisoning damage is likely permanent. Even after treatment, severe methanol poisoning can leave survivors with long-term complications, most of which involve the eyes or the central nervous system.

Long-term visual sequelae of methanol induced toxic optic neuropathy 
Because of their high energy dependency, retinal ganglion cells and their axons, which compose the optic nerve, are particularly sensitive to histotoxic hypoxia induced by formic acid suppression of mitochondrial cytochrome C oxidase. The biochemical and morphologic alterations caused by formate poisoning are also seen in retinal photoreceptors, Müller cells (retinal glial cells), and cells of the underlying retinal pigment epithelium. The symptoms of ocular toxicity develop after a latency period of 8–48 hours or more in acute methanol poisonings, depending on the amount of methanol consumed, probable ethanol co-ingestion, and other circumstances.

However, the symptoms of long term visual damage may persist in10-30% of patients. This can involve peripheral constriction of visual fields and central scotoma, as well as diminished visual acuity, loss of colour vision, and blindness in severe instances.

Long-term central nervous system sequelae of methanol poisoning

Damage to the nervous system 
Bilateral necrosis of basal ganglia, mostly of the putamen, with or without haemorrhage, and haemorrhagic lesions in the subcortical white matter are typical CT and MRI findings in acute methanol poisoning.

Among other less typical MR findings in methanol poisoned patients there are also necrotic changes and haemorrhagic lesions in the globus pallidus, nucleus caudate, thalamus, cerebellum, brainstem, pons, cerebral cortex, and optic nerve atrophy.

Cognitive impairment 
Methanol poisoning is associated with executive dysfunction and explicit memory impairment, due to basal ganglia dysfunction and disruption of frontostriatal circuitry proportional to the number of brain lesions.

Local and international criticisms

Local criticisms 
Although the government had made a series of responses shortly, problems have not been solved from the root causes. There are some criticisms from the local congress and other parties. After a few days of this tragedy, two Congress Rajya Sabha MPs had condemned their party, and criticizing Amarinder Singh's responses was a "clear-cut failure". In addition, Bishop Agnelo Rufino Gracias is the auxiliary bishop emeritus of Bombay and apostolic administrator of Jalandhar Diocese. In a report in UCA News, He said, "It's a tragedy that could have easily been avoided without relevant authorities being alert. It is a manufactured tragedy". As we can see, the handling of the matter by the local government was highly controversial. Moreover, the opposite Aam Aadmi Party (AAP) had held several local protests, criticising the government's indifference to the plight of the people. And its malfeasance in causing the alcohol poisoning, of which most of the victims were the poor population.

International criticisms 
Since 1992, an average of around 1,000 people have died from drinking alcohol illegally, which has caused much international concern. The Guardian UK reported in 2019 on a similar tragic incident in India, in which 200 people died. It also presented that the danger of that type of fake alcohol was the addition of formaldehyde to it by unscrupulous traders. Despite many reports on local and international news platforms, hopefully serving as a warning to the people, it did not prevent the disaster in Punjab 2020. In addition, Chinese Journalists analyzed the reasons for recurrence incidents. The Indian government passed a bill act in 2009 to prevent illegal alcohol. However, the situation still has not improved. The journalist pointed out two ways to solve this problem: for the Indian government to open up the alcohol license and lower taxes to reduce the price of wine.

Lessons learned from the disaster 
This contamination in illicit alcoholic drinks leads to deaths has been a global problem, chiefly in developing countries (WHO,2014). India seems to be among affected in the worst list and the main reason is policing issues disregarded by the state. From the plenty of sociologists’ analyses and comments, so what can be done?

Regulated the product and sale industry 
The bulk of the responsibility lies with the government, which needs to formulate effective strategies to manage Industrial production to prevent methanol addition. Indeed, the laws exist (eg: stipulated minimum life imprisonment and a maximum hanging sentence in 2009) but need enforcing. In the southern states, the rate of poisoning accidents had declined with the excise departments' stringent (2015). It is necessary to improve the edibility criteria although the implementation of public health policies is a barrier of vested.

Financial for welfare and technological 
Illicit liquor stem from the high cost of legally produced and the poor cannot afford it with exorbitance taxes and excise duties. ‘Traditional’ alcohol (homebrew) is one low-cost distilled beverage with poor quality that results in variable concentrations of methanol, which is the main factor of poisoning. However, this type is still permitted in some fewer welfare areas by license holders for making money. Methanol is the factor of death that causes fatality rates over 30% (WHO,2014). It will be metabolized to formaldehyde and formic acid which can cause tissue damage and death. Meanwhile，high death rates also result from early unspecified symptoms and lack of specialty drugs like fomepizole resulting in a delay in seeking medical attention. Therefore, Fund may require further support in the welfare and technology area.

Diet health defences and interventions 
"We must use every possible avenue to communicate the hazards of alcohol dependence to the public, including mass media, television, and community" said Pavan Sonar (BMJ). So it is humanitarian action to add diet health defences and interventions which can prevent and alleviate this industrial accident.

References 

2020 disasters in India
2020s in Punjab, India
Alcohol-related deaths in India
August 2020 events in India
Alcohol poisonings
July 2020 crimes in Asia
Methanol poisoning incidents
July 2020 events in India